Lectionary 306 (Gregory-Aland), designated by siglum ℓ 306 (in the Gregory-Aland numbering) is a Greek manuscript of the New Testament, on parchment. Palaeographically it has been assigned to the 13th century. The manuscript is lacunose.

Description 

The original codex contained lessons from the Gospels (Evangelistarium), on 136 parchment leaves, with some lacunae. The leaves are measured.
The first 54 other leaves were lost. The additional lessons about the season of Epiphany were inserted by other hand.

The text is written in Greek minuscule letters, in one column per page, 16-18 lines per page.

It contains music notes.

History 

Gregory and Scrivener dated the manuscript to the 13th century. It has been assigned by the Institute for New Testament Textual Research (INTF) to the 13th century.

It was bought from Quaritch for the university in 1874.

The manuscript was added to the list of New Testament manuscripts by Frederick Henry Ambrose Scrivener (292e) and Caspar René Gregory (number 306e). It was examined by Fenton John Anthony Hort. Gregory saw it in 1883.

The codex is housed at the Cambridge University Library (Add. Mss. 1836) in Cambridge.

See also 

 List of New Testament lectionaries
 Biblical manuscript
 Textual criticism
 Lectionary 305

Notes and references

Bibliography 

 

Greek New Testament lectionaries
13th-century biblical manuscripts
Manuscripts in Cambridge